Thomas Harvey (born 1888, date of death unknown) was a British cyclist. He competed at the 1920 and 1924 Summer Olympics.

References

External links
 

1888 births
Year of death missing
British male cyclists
Olympic cyclists of Great Britain
Cyclists at the 1920 Summer Olympics
Cyclists at the 1924 Summer Olympics
Place of birth missing